Nasty Boys is an American action drama television series based on the real life Narcotics Officers of the North Las Vegas Police Department. It follows the 1989 film Nasty Boys and aired on NBC from February 19 to May 18, 1990.

Overview
The innovative cops were known locally as the NTNB which stood for the North Town Narcotics Bureau but quickly were nicknamed the North Town "Nasty Boys" by the local drug dealers because of the unit's all black hooded raid uniforms and their quick breaching methods for serving search warrants. The unit caught the attention of the producers of "The Reporters" while they were in Las Vegas for an unrelated show. It was the practice of the unit at the time to allow the local press to ride with them and tape their raids and "Reversals", that's where the cops take over a drug sales location and then pretend to be the drug sellers busting the arriving buyers one by one. Then with the help of the local NBC affiliate would air the bust on the 11:00 p.m. news with the opening, "The Nasty Boys shut down another drug sales location at ..." The Reporters aired a segment showcasing the Nasty Boys serving warrants and speaking their "Say No To Drugs" presentation to local adult and children's organizations.

Two of the undercover narcotics officers, Jimmy Jackson and Larry Bradley, began the anti-drug presentations with a rap song, BUSTED, written by Bradley and sung by three of them. This was followed by T-shirts that read, "BUSTED by the Nasty Boys" and another showing a photo of the hooded team with the caption "We Make House Calls!". The NBC affiliate KVBC produced several award-winning anti-drug Public Service Announcements that featured real-life footage of the Nasty Boys making busts, one of which shows the North Las Vegas Chief of Police looking into the camera, with the heavily armed team behind him, saying, "If you sell drugs in North Las Vegas, we'll be knocking at your door."

Cast
 Don Franklin as Alex Wheeler
 Benjamin Bratt as Eduardo Cruz
 Craig Hurley as Danny Larsen
 James Pax as Jimmy Kee
 Jeff Kaake as Paul Morrissey
 Dennis Franz as Lt. Stan Krieger
 Nia Peeples as Serena Cruz
 Sandy McPeak as Chief Bradley

Jimmy Jackson and Larry Bradley were technical advisors/actors.

Episodes

Production and broadcast history
Producer Dick Wolf, of Miami Vice fame and later of Law & Order fame, noticed the Nasty Boys and proposed to the two North Las Vegas Narcotics Officers, Jimmy Jackson and Larry Bradley, who had produced the anti-drug song that a television show to be released by Universal Studios, and broadcast on the NBC network. Jackson and Bradley agreed and provided stories to the writers, were technical advisors and acted in the pilot and several episodes. A pilot episode was aired as a TV movie September 21, 1989, and 13 episodes aired as a mid-season replacement show. The show was very popular with a small cult following but the Universal Studios-produced Nasty Boys was not renewed because that same year, NBC had begun producing many of their own television shows and only renewed one non-NBC production that year.

The Nasty Boys featured a diverse North Las Vegas Police narcotics unit consisting of six undercover police officers who fought crime in drug-ridden neighborhoods using “unorthodox” methods. The show starred Benjamin Bratt, Don Franklin, Craig Hurley, Jeff Kaake, James Pax, and Dennis Franz, who played Lieutenant Stan Krieger. William Russ played Lieutenant Farlow in the pilot movie and was killed off unexpectedly.

Basil Poledouris composed most of the episode scores.

The theme song was "Nasty" by Janet Jackson, though the song was performed by Lisa Keith and the lyrics were changed to fit the TV series.

References

External links
  on Wolf Entertainment
 
 Behind the scenes of Nasty Boys

1990 American television series debuts
1990 American television series endings
NBC original programming
English-language television shows
Television series by Universal Television
Television shows set in the Las Vegas Valley
Television series created by Dick Wolf
Television series by Wolf Films